Serena Williams was the defending champion and successfully defended her title by defeating Lindsay Davenport 4–6, 6–4, 7–6(7–1) in the final.

Seeds
The first four seeds received a bye into the second round.

Draw

Finals

Top half

Bottom half

External links
 Official Results Archive (ITF)
 Official Results Archive (WTA)

estyle.com Classic